Surviving Christmas is a 2004 American romantic comedy film directed by Mike Mitchell, written by Harry Elfont, Deborah Kaplan, Jennifer Ventimilia, and Joshua Sternin, based on a story by Elfont and Kaplan, and starring Ben Affleck, James Gandolfini, Christina Applegate, and Catherine O'Hara.

Initially slated for a Christmas 2003 release, the film was pushed back to avoid competition with Affleck's 2003 sci-fi thriller Paycheck. The film received negative reviews from film critics. It grossed $15.1 million worldwide from a $45 million budget, making it a box office bomb. At the Golden Raspberry Awards, the film received nominations for Worst Picture, Worst Actor and Worst Screenplay, winning neither.

Plot
Just before Christmas, wealthy advertising executive Drew Latham surprises his girlfriend Missy with first-class tickets to Fiji, but she is horrified that he would want to spend Christmas away from his family. Citing the fact that Drew has never even introduced her to his family, she concludes that he will never get serious about their relationship and dumps him. Drew has his assistant send her a Cartier bracelet to apologize. Desperate not to spend Christmas alone, Drew calls all his contacts to find a place to stay on Christmas, but he is not close enough to anyone to be invited.

Drew tracks down Missy's therapist Dr. Freeman at the airport, hoping for a therapy session. The hurried doctor tells him to list all of his grievances and then burn them at his childhood home, which is now occupied by the Valcos.

As Drew is acting suspiciously, when he sets his grievances on fire, Tom Valco sneaks up behind him and knocks him out with a shovel. When he comes to, they let him to look around. He is thrilled to see his old room, so Drew impetuously offers Tom $250,000 to let him spend Christmas with them. He accepts, and Drew's lawyer draws up a contract that requires the Valcos to pose as his family.

The next day, Drew forces the family to go out and buy a tree together, requiring Tom to wear a Santa cap in public. While they are trimming the tree, their eldest child, Alicia, arrives for the holidays and is stunned by Drew's presence. He suggests that she could portray the maid since she is an unexpected addition to the scenario. 

Drew writes a script for the family to read at the table at dinner. He hires a local actor to play the part of his grandfather, whom he calls Doo-Dah, and Tom agrees to let Doo-Dah stay with them for the holidays for an extra $25,000. Drew takes Alicia and her brother Brian sledding the next day. After crashing at the bottom of a hill, he moves in to kiss Alicia, who sneezes instead. 

Recovering back home from their growing colds, Alicia shares a childhood memory with Drew about an old tree that was coated in ice during a storm. Tom asks Drew to leave because he plans to divorce his wife, Christine, but Drew encourages the couple to indulge themselves. Tom buys a Chevelle SS, which he had in high school, and Christine goes to a photographer for some glamour shots.

Drew takes Alicia to the old tree of her childhood, which he has covered in ice again. The gesture touches her, but Drew overdoes it, bringing in a full pageant production to surround the tree. Disgusted by his lack of restraint, Alicia demands that he leave, which he decides to do, and he ends their agreement and is set to write them a check. 

Meanwhile, Missy is won over by the bracelet, and when Drew's assistant informs her that he is spending Christmas with his family, Missy phones Tom to tell him she's outside the house with her parents. Drew quickly promises the Valcos an extra $75,000 if they keep playing along for the evening, and they agree. 

The visit between the two families steadily descends into chaos, culminating with everyone seeing Christine's glamour shots manipulated into pornography on Brian's computer. Missy's parents storm out, and Drew informs her that their relationship is over, as a bit earlier Alicia kissed him.

Drew tells Alicia the truth about his family: his father left them when he was just four, and his mother, a waitress, who would give him an adult stack of pancakes on Christmas until he was 18, died when he was in college. 

Drew returns to his apartment to spend Christmas alone. Tom visits him to collect his money, and the two decide to go watch the actor who played Doo-Dah perform in the local production of A Christmas Carol as he'd given the whole family tickets. At the play Tom and Christine decide not to divorce. Drew and Alicia make up outside the theater, and everyone then eats in the diner where Drew's mother worked double shifts to make extra money at Christmastime.

Cast

 Ben Affleck as Drew Latham
 James Gandolfini as Tom Valco
 Christina Applegate as Alicia Valco
 Catherine O'Hara as Christine Valco
 Josh Zuckerman as Brian Valco
 Bill Macy as Doo-Dah/Saul
 Jennifer Morrison as Missy Vangilder
 Udo Kier as Heinrich
 David Selby as Horace Vangilder
 Stephanie Faracy as Letitia Vangilder
 Stephen Root as Dr. Freeman
 Sy Richardson as Doo-Dah Understudy
 Tangie Ambrose as Kathryn
 Peter Jason as Suit
 Ray Buffer as Arnie
 Phill Lewis as Levine the Lawyer
 Hailey Noelle Johnson as Little girl
 Sean Marquette as Older brother
 Sonya Eddy as Security lady
 Tom Kenny as Man wrapping gift

Production 
In May 2001, it was announced Affleck was in talks to star in Surviving Christmas when the project was at Columbia Pictures.

Release

Box office
Surviving Christmas opened theatrically on October 22, 2004, in 2,750 venues, earning $4,441,356 in its opening weekend and ranking seventh in the North American box office and second among the week's new releases. The film ended its run on November 23, 2004, with $11,663,156 domestically and $3,457,644 overseas for a worldwide total of $15,120,800.

Critical response
The site's critics' consensus states: "Surviving Christmas is unpleasant characters attacking each other for 90 minutes before delivering a typical, hollow anti-consumerist message." It was ranked #91 in the site's 100 worst reviewed films of the 2000s on the site, as well as the fourth-worst Christmas movie of all-time. On Metacritic it has a weighted average score of 19 out of 100, based on 29 critics, indicating "overwhelming dislike". Audiences polled by CinemaScore gave the film an average grade of "C+" on an A+ to F scale.

Writing in Entertainment Weekly, Lisa Schwarzbaum said, "Really, critics and audiences ought to turn thoughts and wallets discreetly away from Surviving Christmas, ignoring the sight as if Santa had just stepped in droppings from Donner and Blitzen." In The New York Times, Stephen Holden concluded, "This is a film that perversely refuses to trust its own comic instincts. Perhaps out of a fear of not having enough jokes, it throws in extra subplots and unnecessary characters to keep the pace frantic, and the action muddled."

Accolades
The film was nominated for three Golden Raspberry Awards at the 2005 ceremony:
 Golden Raspberry Award for Worst Picture (lost to Catwoman)
 Golden Raspberry Award for Worst Actor (Affleck; lost to George W. Bush in Fahrenheit 9/11)
 Golden Raspberry Award for Worst Screenplay (lost to Catwoman)

Home media
The film was released on DVD on December 21, 2004, just two months after its theatrical release.

See also
 2004 in film
 List of Christmas films

References

External links

 

 

2004 films
2000s Spanish-language films
2004 romantic comedy films
American Christmas comedy films
American romantic comedy films
Films about dysfunctional families
Films directed by Mike Mitchell
Films set in Chicago
Films shot in California
Films shot in Chicago
Films shot in Los Angeles
DreamWorks Pictures films
Films scored by Randy Edelman
2000s Christmas comedy films
2000s English-language films
2000s American films